Microbacter is a genus of bacteria from the family of Porphyromonadaceae, with one known species (Microbacter margulisiae).

References

Further reading 
 

Bacteroidia
Bacteria genera
Monotypic bacteria genera